The Day of Remembrance (DOR, Tsuioku no Hi) is a day of observance for the incarceration of Japanese Americans during World War II. Events in numerous U.S. states, especially in the West Coast, are held on or near February 19, the day in 1942 that Executive Order 9066 was signed by President Franklin D. Roosevelt, requiring internment of all Americans of Japanese ancestry.

Presidential Proclamation 
In 2022, President Joe Biden issued a presidential proclamation declaring February 19, 2022 as the national Day of Remembrance of Japanese American Incarceration During World War II. 

Congresswoman Doris Matsui released a statement noting that on Day of Remembrance, "the Japanese American community comes together to not only reflect, but to tell our story, teach others, and lift up the voices of our community" and noted that all Americans "share the charge to ensure that our country not only learns from, but never forgets its past."

Washington
The first Day of Remembrance, observing the day that Executive Order 9066 was signed and authorizing the Japanese American internment, was in the state of Washington on November 25, 1978, organized by the Evacuation Redress Committee. Co-sponsors included thirty churches, veterans' groups, and other social organizations, as well as the national Japanese American Citizens League (JACL). The event took place mainly at the Puyallup fairgrounds, which had served in 1942 as the assembly center named Camp Harmony. Although initially resistant, the board of the Western Washington Fair ultimately voted unanimously to allow the event to use the fairgrounds free of charge. The National Guard provided several large trucks similar to those used in 1942 to lead a caravan from Sicks' Stadium in Seattle to Puyallup, replicating the route taken by some of the internees. One of the key organizers of the first day of remembrance was Chinese-American writer, Frank Chin.

The University of Washington Department of American Ethnic Studies held its first Day of Remembrance program in 1997, and has held such a program all but three of the years since. At the 2008 ceremony, called The Long Journey Home, the university granted honorary baccalaureate degrees to all 449 of their former Japanese American students who had been affected by Executive Order 9066.

The state of Washington has officially recognized the DOR since 2003.

Oregon

The first Day of Remembrance event in Oregon occurred February 17, 1979, less than three months after the initial Washington event. Like the Washington event, it was held at a detention site: the former site of the Pacific International Livestock Exposition, which, in 1942, had been the site of the Portland Assembly Center.

California
In 2013, a ceremony was to be held in San Francisco's Japantown district. Los Angeles County has officially recognized the day.
In 1986 Governor George Deukmejian declared February 19, 1986 to be a Day of Remembrance in California, the first DOR designation by the state of California., two and a half years before the "redress bill" (Civil Liberties Act of 1988) was signed on August 10, 1988.

See also
 Bainbridge Island Japanese American Exclusion Memorial
 Densho: The Japanese American Legacy Project
 Empty Chair Memorial
 Fred Korematsu Day
 Go for Broke Monument
 Harada House
 Japanese American Memorial to Patriotism During World War II
 National Japanese American Veterans Memorial Court
 Sakura Square
 Japanese American redress and court cases
 Japanese American service in World War II

References

Internment of Japanese Americans
Culture of San Francisco
Events in California
Events in Oregon
Culture of Los Angeles
Events in Washington (state)